Overlook Park is a public park in Ridgefield, Washington, United States. The park features an amphitheater, a brick plaza, public restrooms, and historical information.

References

External links
 

Parks in Clark County, Washington
Ridgefield, Washington